Brian Whitaker (sometimes credited as Brian Whittaker; born 13 June 1947) is a British journalist and writer.

He studied Arabic studies at the University of Westminster and Latin (BA Hons) at the University of Birmingham. A former joint investigations editor of The Sunday Times, he left the title at the time of the Wapping dispute. For a period during 1987, he was editor of the short-lived News on Sunday tabloid. The newspaper published extracts from Spycatcher by Peter Wright in August 1987 while Whitaker was editor. The title was eventually fined £50,000 in May 1989 for contempt of court in breaking an injunction upheld by the Law Lords shortly before publication.

Whitaker worked for the British newspaper The Guardian from 1987 and was its Middle East editor from 2000 to 2007. He runs a personal, non-Guardian-related website, Al-Bab.com, about politics in the Arab world.

Works
Unspeakable Love: Gay and Lesbian Life in the Middle East, 2006 (London: Saqi Books) , (Berkeley:University of California Press) , 
What's "Really" Wrong with the Middle East?, 2009 (London: Saqi Books) , 
Arabs Without God: Atheism and Freedom of Belief in the Arab World, 2014 (CreateSpace)

References

External links

Column archive at The Guardian

Al-Bab.com Arab culture and politics website

1947 births
Living people
British male journalists
Alumni of the University of Birmingham